Carla Cortijo Sánchez (born July 21, 1987) is an American former professional basketball player. She played college basketball for the Texas Longhorns and the Puerto Rican national team.

Early life
Cortijo was born in San Juan, Puerto Rico to Angel Cortijo and Lourdes Sanchez.  She grew up in the city of Carolina, Puerto Rico.  Cortijo first earned widespread fame for her basketball skills during two seasons of play for Maria Auxiliadora High School, which went undefeated and won the Puerto Rico commonwealth championship both years.  Cortijo was named Puerto Rico's High School Basketball Player of the Year for 2002.

After Cortijo's sophomore season, her family moved to the Houston area. Cortijo attracted national attention as a star point guard for Bellaire High School.  She also played AAU basketball for the Houston Elite squad, leading them to the 2004 AAU national title.  Cortijo earned Parade Magazine All-American honors for her high school play, and was rated the nation's best point guard in her recruiting class by All Star Girls Report.  However, she missed her entire high school senior season with an injury to her left knee.

College career
Cortijo signed with the University of Texas. Early in her freshman season, she re-injured her knee, and received a medical redshirt waiver for the 2005–2006 season.

As a redshirt freshman in 2006–2007, Cortijo played in 28 games for the Longhorns and started in 18.  She led the team in assists, with 137 on the season.  Cortijo was one of five players named to the Big 12 All-Freshman Team and the Big 12 All-Academic First Team.

Cortijo announced during the offseason that she planned to transfer to St. John's University in New York. However, Texas coach Gail Goestenkors eventually persuaded Cortijo to rejoin the Longhorns for the 2007–2008 season.

Cortijo is majoring in Spanish and minoring in textiles.

Texas statistics
Source

WNBA controversy
Cortijo alleged that the then Puerto Rican Basketball Federation president Carlos Beltrán denied her an opportunity to play in the Women's National Basketball Association (WNBA) for the Atlanta Dream in order for her to participate with the Puerto Rican women's national basketball team at the 2015 Edmonton, Alberta, Canada Women's Pre-Olympic qualifying tournament.

International career
Cortijo represented Puerto Rico in the international competitions sanctioned by FIBA. As regular point guard, she led the team to the gold medal at the 2011 Pan American Games, which advanced to the finals gathering victories over the United States, Argentina and Brazil. In the gold medal game, Cortijo scored 29 points and recovered 10 rebounds, being Puerto Rico's most productive player in the victory over Mexico.

She was a member of the team which competed for Puerto Rico at the 2011 Pan American Games, winning a gold medal.

See also
 List of famous Puerto Ricans

References

External links
 University of Texas media guide

1987 births
Living people
Atlanta Dream players
Basketball players at the 2011 Pan American Games
Pan American Games gold medalists for Puerto Rico
Parade High School All-Americans (girls' basketball)
Point guards
Puerto Rican women's basketball players
Sportspeople from San Juan, Puerto Rico
Texas Longhorns women's basketball players
Pan American Games medalists in basketball
Central American and Caribbean Games gold medalists for Puerto Rico
Central American and Caribbean Games silver medalists for Puerto Rico
Competitors at the 2010 Central American and Caribbean Games
Competitors at the 2014 Central American and Caribbean Games
Central American and Caribbean Games medalists in basketball
Medalists at the 2011 Pan American Games